The Brunecker Turm is a mountain belonging to the Sella group in the Dolomites in South Tyrol, Italy.

References 
Alpenverein South Tyrol 

Mountains of the Alps
Mountains of South Tyrol
Dolomites